Sandweiler-Contern railway station is a railway station serving the towns of Contern and Sandweiler, in southern Luxembourg. It is operated by Chemins de Fer Luxembourgeois, the state-owned railway company.

The Railway station was in the commune of Hesperange but in the December 2015 the station was rebuilt closer to the main road connecting Contern and Sandweiler and the Industrial zone between them where the station is located. The new station is in the commune of contern but within a few hundred metres from the border with both the communes of Hesperange and Sandweiler and the old station.

The Old Station building and one of the platforms are still visible from beside the railways line.

The station is situated on Line 30, which connects Luxembourg City to the east of the country and Trier.

It gets Local services to Wittlich and faster services to Trier/Koblenz.

External links
 Official CFL page on Sandweiler-Contern station
 Rail.lu page on Sandweiler-Contern station

Buildings and structures in Hesperange
Railway stations in Luxembourg
Railway stations on CFL Line 30

Contern